Rendra Wijaya (born 1 November 1984) is an Indonesian male badminton player who specializes in doubles. He joined PB Djarum badminton club in 2007.

Personal life
Wijaya grew in badminton family. His father, Hendra Wijaya is a former badminton player and owner of Rajawali badminton club in Cirebon. His brothers, Indra and Candra are former Indonesian badminton player and part of the Indonesia national badminton team at the 1996 and 1998 Thomas Cup. Her sister, Sandrawati Wijaya also a badminton player. He married Fransisca Carollim in 2011.

Career 
Wijaya won his first international tournament at the 2008 Spanish Open in the men's and mixed doubles event. Together with his partner in the men's doubles Fran Kurniawan he also won 2008 Finnish and Austrian International Series tournament. At the 2008 Indonesia International Challenge, he and Kurniawan won the men's doubles title after beat their compatriot Windarto and Wirawan in the straight games with the score 21-18, 21-13. In the Grand Prix level, he and Kurniawan won their first title at the Dutch Open tournament. In the final round they won in straight games to Indian paired. Teamed-up with Rian Sukmawan he won the 2011 White Nights and Indonesia International Challenge tournament.

Achievements

BWF Grand Prix 
The BWF Grand Prix has two level such as Grand Prix and Grand Prix Gold. It is a series of badminton tournaments, sanctioned by Badminton World Federation (BWF) since 2007.

Men's Doubles

 BWF Grand Prix Gold tournament
 BWF Grand Prix tournament

BWF International Challenge/Series
Men's doubles

Mixed doubles

 BWF International Challenge tournament
 BWF International Series tournament
 BWF Future Series tournament

References

External links
 

1984 births
Living people
Sportspeople from West Java
People from Cirebon
Indonesian male badminton players
Indonesian people of Chinese descent